Julián Schweizer (born 1998) is a Uruguayan surfer. In 2019, he was awarded the silver medal at the Pan American Games in Lima, Peru.

References

1998 births
Living people
Uruguayan people of Swiss descent
Uruguayan surfers
Surfers at the 2019 Pan American Games
Pan American Games silver medalists for Uruguay
Medalists at the 2019 Pan American Games
Pan American Games medalists in surfing